The 1941 Columbia Lions football team was an American football team that represented the Columbia University in the Ivy League during the 1941 college football season. In their 12th season under head coach Lou Little, the team compiled a 3–5 record and was outscored by a combined total of 103 to 81. The team played its home games at Baker Field in Manhattan.

The team was led by left halfback Paul Governali who was selected by the Associated Press as a second-team player on the 1941 All-Eastern football team. Governali went on to win the Maxwell Award in 1942 and was later inducted into the College Football Hall of Fame.

Schedule

References

Columbia
Columbia Lions football seasons
Columbia Lions football